Favartia alveata is a species of sea snail, a marine gastropod mollusk in the family Muricidae, the murex snails or rock snails.

Description

Distribution
This species occurs in the Caribbean Sea off Guadeloupe.

References

 Espinosa J. & Ortea J. (2017). Dos nuevas especies de la familia Muricidae Rafinesque, 1815 (Mollusca: Neogastropoda) de la isla de Martinica, Antillas Menores. Avicennia. 20: 41-44.
 Garrigues B. & Lamy D. (2019). Inventaire des Muricidae récoltés au cours de la campagne MADIBENTHOS du MNHN en Martinique (Antilles Françaises) et description de 12 nouvelles espèces des genres Dermomurex, Attilosa, Acanthotrophon, Favartia, Muricopsis et Pygmaepterys (Mollusca, Gastropoda). Xenophora Taxonomy. 23: 22-59.

External links
 Kiener, L. C. (1841-1843). Spécies général et iconographie des coquilles vivantes. Vol. 7. Famille des Canalifères. Troisième partie. Genres Rocher (Murex) Linné, pp. 1-130 + unpaginated erratum, pl. 1-47 [pp. 1-16 (1842), 17-130 (1843); pl. 1-47 (1842); Triton (Triton) Lamarck, pp. 1-48, pl. 1-18 [all (1842)]; Ranelle (Ranella) Lamarck, pp. 1-40, pl. 1-15 [pp. 1-40 (1842), pl. 1-15 (1841)]. Paris, Rousseau & J.B. Baillière]
 Adams, C. B. 1850. Description of supposed new species of marine shells which inhabit Jamaica. Contributions to Conchology, 4: 56-68, 109-123

Gastropods described in 1842
Favartia